Joseph J. DiBlasi is an American politician who represented the 6th district in the Baltimore City Council. He is widely known for attending every city council meeting for over 12 years.

Early life and education
DiBlasi was born and raised in Baltimore, Maryland. He attended the University of Baltimore where he received a B.S. in Business Management.

Career
DiBlasi, by profession, is a banker.  He served as an Assistant Comptroller, then as Vice President of Maryland National Bank and NationsBank (now Bank of America). After his time on the Council, DiBlasi became a writer and senior content editor covering varsity sports for Digital Sports and the Varsity Sports Network

Politics

In the council
Due to his business banking background DiBlasi was named chairman of the Budget and Appropriations Committee and served in that role until 1991 and used that experience to run on a pro-business platform during the 1995 Baltimore City Council Presidential Election.

He also served as the Chairman of the Professional and Municipal Sports Committee in the Council.

He played an integral part in passing legislation that paved the way for Oriole Park at Camden Yards and proposed legislation during the 1994–95 Major League Baseball strike that would have preserved Cal Ripken's consecutive game streak if Major League players were replaced by replacement players.

DiBlasi ran for Council President in 1995 but finished a close second to Lawrence Bell who served one term as president.

Since the council
Prior to his run for City Council, DiBlasi was a highly successful baseball and basketball coach in South Baltimore, and after his time in the Council, he served as member of the Baltimore Municipal and Zoning Appeals Board. He is currently a Business, Government, and Sports Marketing Consultant.

References

University of Baltimore alumni
1946 births
Living people
Baltimore City Council members